Rufina is a commune in Tuscany.

Rufina may also refer to:
Rufina (name),  a female first name and surname
Rufina, Guayanilla, Puerto Rico, a barrio in Puerto Rico
Rufina Patis, Philippine brand of fish sauce made by fermenting salted fish for several months
, species of insect

See also 
 Rufus (disambiguation)